Marino Sanuto or Marino Sanudo may refer to:
 Marino Sanuto the Elder (c. 1260 – 1338), Venetian statesman and geographer
 Marino Sanuto the Younger (1466–1536), Venetian historian